The Motorola Defy (A8210/MB525) is an Android-based smartphone from Motorola. It filled a niche market segment, by being one of the few small, IP67 rated smartphones available at the time of its late 2010 release. It is water resistant, dust resistant, and has an impact-resistant screen. The phone was launched unlocked in Germany, France, Italy, Hungary, India, Thailand, Spain, the UK, Turkey, Romania and Greece under various networks and was distributed exclusively by a number of carriers, including T-Mobile in the United States, Telus in Canada, and Telstra and Optus in Australia. An updated version of the original MB525, Defy+ (MB526) is also available.

Description
The phone is a bar format with a touch screen and four Android touch buttons on the front. It has Wi-Fi (IEEE 802.11b-1999, IEEE 802.11g-2003, IEEE 802.11n-2009), 5-megapixel camera with LED flash, speakerphone, 800 MHz TI OMAP3630 processor, a  FWVGA LCD. Lacking a physical keyboard, the phone instead provides the Swype virtual keyboard and an alternative multi-touch QWERTY keyboard. The Defy shares its platform with Motorola Bravo though there are minor differences in exterior design, 3G band, lower resolution camera without LED flash and non-weather resistance. The Defy is "water-resistant" with all covers closed (battery, USB, and audio jack).

Hardware 
The Defy CPU/GPU is TI OMAP3 architecture OMAP3630 and the PowerVR SGX530. The OMAP 3 is the industry's first 45-nm CMOS processor set at 800 MHz in ARM Cortex-A8 superscalar microprocessor core.  Under-clocked CPU frequencies (below ARM manufacturer specs of 1 GHz) & high CPU voltage levels on the stock phone led to much lower performance and battery life on stock settings than the hardware is capable of.  This can be modified on rooted phones, using 3rd party tools (e.g. SetVSel app) or custom ROMs, with stable performance over 1 GHz being common.

A minor hardware change and possible hardware refresh on MB526 models was observed, mainly noticeable by the camera lens being red ('Bayer' camera), instead of green.

Gallery

Defy+, XT, Mini, Pro 

Three variant/successor models: Motorola Defy Plus, Motorola Defy XT and Motorola Defy Mini, all with the same IP67 rating, have been released. The Defy Plus released in August 2011 uses a 1 GHz processor setting by default, a higher resolution camera and a 1700 mAh battery.

The Defy Mini variation uses a 600 MHz CPU in ARM Cortex-A5 microprocessor core, 512 MiB RAM, Adreno 200 Enhanced GPU at 200 MHz with a Qualcomm MSM architecture, MSM7225A chipset and a 3.2 inch screen, with a 320x480 resolution (180 dpi). The Mini is targeted at the low-end category of smartphones.

The Defy XT variation uses a 1 GHz CPU in ARM Cortex-A5 microprocessor core, 512 MiB RAM, Adreno 200 Enhanced GPU at 245 MHz with a Qualcomm MSM architecture, MSM7627A chipset and a 3.7 inch screen, with an 854x480 resolution (245 dpi). The Defy XT is targeted at the mid-range category of smartphones.

The Defy Pro is a QWERTY keyboard variant.

See also 
 Galaxy Nexus
 Samsung Galaxy Xcover
 Sony Ericsson Xperia Active

References

External links 

 Motorola DEFY Full hardware specs
 Motorola DEFY with MotoBlur - Tech Specs - United States
 Motorola DEFY with MotoBlur - Tech Specs - Western Europe
 Motorola DEFY with MotoBlur - Tech Specs - Australia
 XDA Developers Motorola Defy status
 CyanogenMod 10, Android 4.1.2 Jellybean for Defy and Defy+

Android (operating system) devices
Mobile phones introduced in 2010
Discontinued smartphones
Motorola smartphones
Mobile phones with user-replaceable battery